Green Island is an island in the Napa River, upstream of San Pablo Bay (an embayment of San Francisco Bay). It is in Napa County, California, and managed as part of the Napa-Sonoma Marshes Wildlife Area. It, long with Island No. 1, Island No. 2 and Tubbs Island, are labeled on a 1902 USGS map of the area.

References

Islands of Napa County, California
Islands of Northern California
San Pablo Bay